Ad Fines may refer to Ancient Roman settlements at:

 Chew Green near Alwinton in Northumberland, UK
 Gornji Hruševec, Croatia
 Pfyn, Switzerland
 Kursumlija, Serbia
 Topusko, Croatia